Cyanea kuhihewa is a rare species of flowering plant in the bellflower family known by the common name Limahuli Valley cyanea. It is endemic to Kauai, where only two mature plants are known from a single wild population. Like other Cyanea it is known as haha in Hawaiian.

This Hawaiian lobelioid is a "treelet" growing 30 centimeters to over 2 meters in height. The narrow linear leaves are up to 38 centimeters long by 1.5 wide. The inflorescence is a raceme of purple-pink flowers.

When the plant was discovered it was initially thought to be Cyanea linearifolia, an extinct species, and the discovery was broadcast and celebrated. Upon closer examination the plant proved to be quite different from C. linearifolia and was determined to be a new species. It was given the name Cyanea kuhihewa in 1996. The species name kuhihewa is a Hawaiian verb that means "to make an error of judgment, to mistake someone for someone else, to not recognize someone when you first see him".

The type specimen of the plant was collected in 1991, and the following year the habitat was seriously damaged by Hurricane Iniki. Since then the single population dwindled and disappeared. In 2006 the plant was considered "possibly extinct" in the wild. It was rediscovered in 2017. 

The species is threatened by competition with introduced weeds, including Clidemia hirta, Rubus rosifolius, and Sphaeropteris cooperi. Other threats include habitat degradation by pigs, rats, and slugs.

Several seeds have been collected from wild populations, both extinct and extant. These seeds are stored in the National Tropical Botanical Garden and the Lyon Arboretum. Conservationists hope to restore them to the NTBG's Limahuli Preserve.

References

External links
USDA Plants Profile

kuhihewa
Endemic flora of Hawaii
Biota of Kauai
Extinct flora of Hawaii
Plants extinct in the wild
Plants described in 1996